Ward van Osta is a Belgian historian and etymologist. He is a member of the Koninklijke Commissie voor Toponymie en Dialectologie.

Works
 van Osta, Ward, Review: "J. Van Loon: De ontstaansgeschiedenis van het begrip 'stad': een bijdrage van de diachrone semantiek tot de sociaal-economische geschiedenis van Noord-West-Europa, inzonderheid van de Nederlanden". Gent, Koninklijke Academie voor Nederlandse Taal en Letterkunde, 2000, 277 p., ill. .- In: Naamkunde, 32:3-4(2000), p. 221-229
 van Osta, Ward, Overzicht van Noord- en Zuid-Nederlandse lo-namen- Tongeren: Michiels, 2001.- 192 p.- (Werken / Koninklijke Commissie voor Toponymie en Dialectologie Vlaamse Afdeling; 22)

Sources
 Ward van Osta publications, Universiteit Antwerpen Bibliotheek

Flemish historians
Living people
Year of birth missing (living people)
Place of birth missing (living people)